Jang Mi-kwan (born July 21, 1989) is a South Korean actor and model. He is best known for his villainous role in the television series Strong Girl Bong-soon (2017).

Filmography

Television series

Awards and nominations

References

External links
 

1989 births
Living people
South Korean male models
South Korean male television actors
21st-century South Korean male actors
Daekyeung University alumni
People from North Gyeongsang Province